.mz is the Internet country code top-level domain (ccTLD) for Mozambique. Registrations are at the third level beneath the second-level names co.mz, net.mz, adv.mz, mil.mz, org.mz, ac.mz,  gov.mz and edu.mz.

External links
 IANA .mz whois information

Country code top-level domains

sv:Toppdomän#M